Hugh Sheridan (born 30 June 1985) is an Australian actor, singer, television presenter who is known for their role as Ben Rafter in the television series Packed to the Rafters. Sheridan is a four-time Logie Award winner, in the Logie Award for Most Popular Actor category.

Early life
Born in Adelaide, Sheridan was the second youngest of seven children, growing up in the suburb of Millswood, and completing early years of schooling at Loreto College Marryatville, before changing to Saint Ignatius' College, and in senior years to University Senior College. It was during primary school that Sheridan began training at Unley Youth Theatre and Terry Simpson Studios in Adelaide, then going on to study Music at the Victorian College of the Arts and Dance at the Australian Ballet School.

As a youth, Sheridan sang with the State Opera of South Australia, played football for St Ignatius and studied drama at Unley Youth Theatre. Upon leaving the Australian Ballet School, Sheridan was accepted into the prestigious Bachelor of Dramatic Art course at the National Institute of Dramatic Art. In 2007, Sheridan was awarded the Adele Koh Memorial Scholarship by the State Theatre Company of South Australia to study acting in New York.

Career
Sheridan performed in The Lost Echo with the Sydney Theatre Company, and was then hired for the Seven Network series Packed to the Rafters as Ben Rafter. In 2009, Sheridan won the Logie Award for "Most Popular New Male Talent". In February 2011, Sheridan filled in as host on The Kyle & Jackie O Show alongside fellow Packed to the Rafters star George Houvardas. In 2012, Sheridan hosted the Network Ten talent show series I Will Survive, during a production break for Packed to the Rafters.

In 2014, Sheridan appeared in the Seven Network mini series, INXS: Never Tear Us Apart, about the Australian rock band INXS, as the group's bassist Garry Gary Beers.

In 2017, Sheridan was appointed as one of three Fringe Ambassadors for the Adelaide Fringe.

In 2020, the Australian production of Hedwig and the Angry Inch was postponed after a petition highlighted the lack of LGBTQ representation in the show and expressed “disappointment” over the casting of Sheridan in the lead role of Hedwig, whom many believe to be a transgender character. On Instagram, Zoe Terakes shared an open letter to the Sydney Festival penned by a group of people including Daya Czepanski, David Campbell and Michaela Banas, explaining why trans representation is vital when telling the story of a trans character. The letter also called for the recasting of Sheridan, who stated an attraction to both men and women but avoids a sexuality label. In response to the letter, the American creators of Hedwig, John Cameron Mitchell and Stephen Trask, issued a statement saying they did not believe that Hedwig was transgender, and that anyone could play the role, however, the Australian producers, Showtune Productions, cancelled the show. Sheridan shared with the Sydney Morning Herald how this letter, and the following cyber bullying, caused shock and serious mental health issues, including twice considering harm.

In March 2021, Sheridan debuted their stage show, Hughman, at Adelaide Fringe. Sheridan reprised their role as Ben Rafter in Back to the Rafters, an Amazon Prime Video reboot of Packed to the Rafters.

In 2022, Sheridan was revealed to be Rooster when he placed third in Season 4 of The Masked Singer Australia

Music
In December 2008, Sheridan performed on Seven Network's television concert special Carols in the Domain in which they performed "Have Yourself a Merry Little Christmas". In August 2009, they signed a recording contract with Sony Music Australia, releasing their first single "Just Can't Throw Us Away" on Seven's Dancing With the Stars in September 2009. The following month they released the follow up single, "All About Me". Their first album, Speak Love, was released on 27 November 2009 and peaked at number 86 on the Australian ARIA Albums Chart. In June 2010, a remix of the album's title track was released as the album's third and final single. In 2015, Sheridan formed The California Crooners Club with mates Emile Welman and Gabe Roland.  In Spring 2016, CCC toured Adelaide, Sydney and Melbourne to great critical acclaim.

Personal life
Sheridan's sister is Zoe Sheridan, the radio announcer and television presenter on the children's game show Challenger and daytime chat show The Catch-Up.

Sheridan's brother Zachary was reported missing after the April 2015 Nepal earthquake, but was later located unharmed. 

Sheridan came out as non-binary in an Instagram post on 26 June 2021, and is also bisexual.

In an October 2020 interview with Stellar, Sheridan revealed relationships with both women and men but preferred not to label their sexuality.

On 5 March 2021, Sheridan proposed to boyfriend Kurt Roberts during the opening night of the Hughman stage show, however their separation was announced in November 2021.

Filmography

Film

Television

Discography

Albums

Singles

 
Notes

Notes

References

External links
 
 Official website
 California Crooners Club Official website

1985 births
20th-century Australian actors
Australian Ballet School alumni
Australian television actors
Australian non-binary actors
Bisexual musicians
Non-binary musicians
Bisexual actors
Australian LGBT actors
Australian LGBT singers
Living people
Logie Award winners
Australian children's television presenters
Male actors from Adelaide
Musicians from Adelaide
National Institute of Dramatic Art alumni
Bisexual non-binary people